Uuf Kya Jaadoo Mohabbat Hai is a 2004 Indian Hindi-language romantic drama film directed by Manoj J. Bhatia. The film stars newcomers Sammir Dattani and Pooja Kanwal. The film was the first film Dattani shot for and was a box office flop. After this film, Kanwal took a hiatus from Hindi films.

Cast 
Sammir Dattani as Yash
Pooja Kanwal as  Pari 
Mini
Aziz
Sachin Khedekar
Daisy Irani
Mrinal Kulkarni
Tushar Dalvi 
Master Yash Pathak

Soundtrack 
Music by Sandesh Shadnilya. Singer Kunal Ganjawala got his break with this film. A critic from Planet Bollywood said that "Overall, UKJMH has its share of good and its share of not so good. Nonetheless, UKJMH is a good album to have for all music lovers". Indiaglitz said that "Uuf Kya...' music endearing but not memorable".
"Shehzaadi" - Kunal Ganjawala
"Shukriya" -  Kunal Ganjawala, Runa
"Dost" - Sunidhi Chauhan
"Happy Birthday"
"Uff Kya Jaadoo Mohabbat Hai" (version 1) - Sunidhi Chauhan
"Uff Kya Jaadoo Mohabbat Hai" (version 2) - Sunidhi Chauhan (piano played by Richard Clayderman)
"Tum Pe" - Sonu Nigam, Chitra
"Jagmag" -  Vinod Rathod, Chitra
"Dekhar Dil" -  K.K., Sunaidhi Chauhan, Runa, Vinod Rathod

Reception 
Taran Adarsh of Bollywood Hungama gave the film a rating of one-and-a-half out of five stars and said that "On the whole, UUF KYA JAADOO MOHABBAT HAI?! has some appeal for the youth, who may take to it initially. But it just doesn't have the jaadoo to sustain in the wake of strong oppositions in the coming weeks". A critic from Indiaglitz opined that "The two newcomers are more watchable than most of the more with-it but less watchable wannabes who queue up for stardom", but criticised the film's similar plotline to Dil To Pagal Hai.

References